Alexander Louis Teixeira de Mattos  (April 9, 1865 – December 5, 1921), known as Alexander Teixeira de Mattos, was a Dutch-English journalist, literary critic and publisher, who gained his greatest fame as a translator.

Early life
The Teixeira de Mattos Sampaio e Mendes family was of Portuguese Jewish origin, having been driven out of Portugal to the Netherlands by Holy Office persecution. Alexander Teixeira de Mattos was born as a Dutch Protestant to an English mother and a Dutch father. In 1874, when he was nine years old, he and his family moved from Amsterdam to England. There, he studied under Monsignor Thomas John Capel and converted to Roman Catholicism. He then studied at the Kensington Catholic Public School and at the Jesuit school Beaumont College.

Career
After his studies, Teixeira came into contact with J. T. Grein, a London impresario of Dutch origin, and was made secretary of Grein's Independent Theatre Society. He worked as a freelance translator, as the London correspondent of a Dutch newspaper, and as the editor of the papers Dramatic Opinions and The Candid Friend, and, in collaboration with Leonard Smithers, in publishing. He became the official translator of the works of Maurice Maeterlinck, beginning with Maeterlinck's The Double Garden.

Teixera was fluent in English, French, German, Flemish, Dutch, and Danish. In addition to the later works of Maeterlinck, his translations include works by Émile Zola, Alexis de Tocqueville, Maurice Leblanc, Gaston Leroux, François René de Chateaubriand, Paul Kruger, Carl Ewald, Georgette Leblanc, Stijn Streuvels, and Louis Couperus. He considered his greatest achievement to be his complete translation of Jean-Henri Fabre's natural history.

In the 1890s, Teixeira was the leading translator for the Lutetian Society, a group whose mission was "to issue to its members, translations of such representative master-pieces of fiction by Continental authors as are unprocurable in English in an unmutilated rendering." He oversaw the Society's publication of unexpurgated translations of six banned novels by Émile Zola in 1894–5, contributing his own translation of the third volume in the series, La curée.

During World War I, Teixera was head of the Intelligence Section, as well as a member of the Advisory Board, of the War Trade Intelligence Department. Midway through the war, Teixeira became a British subject. In June 1920, he was made a Chevalier of the Order of Leopold II.

Personal life
On 20 October 1900, he married Lily Wilde, née Sophie Lily Lees (1859-1922), the widow of Oscar Wilde's older brother Willie Wilde and thus became the stepfather of Dolly Wilde, then age 5. Alexander and Lily Teixeira de Mattos had one son, who died a few hours after birth.

Teixeira was known to his acquaintances as a dandy and a fastidious worker, keeping strictly to set hours, and was linked to the Symbolist movement thanks to his friendship and travels with Arthur Symons. He was also personal friends with Maurice Maeterlinck and Louis Couperus, both of whom wrote works he translated. He was politically liberal and a devout Catholic.

Due to ill health, Teixeira traveled on a rest cure in 1920 at Crowborough and the Isle of Wight, returning to his home in Chelsea, London in spring 1921. He worked as usual through the autumn and traveled to Cornwall for the winter. On December 5, 1921, in St Ives, Cornwall he collapsed and died from angina pectoris. The New York Times, in its obituary notice, called him "one of the best translators of foreign languages of the present generation." The high quality and readability of Teixera's work was such that many of his translations are still in print today. For example, though his translation of La curée is over a century old, its accuracy and style have given it a status still unrivaled by more modern versions.

List of translations
The dates given in the list below are the publication dates for Teixeira's translations. Unless otherwise referenced, all information in the list is derived from catalog entries in WorldCat.

References

Further reading
 , Louis Couperus in den vreemde (Leiden, 2008). Includes ten letters by Teixeira to the Dutch writer Louis Couperus.

External links

 
 
 
 

1865 births
1921 deaths
Converts to Roman Catholicism from Judaism
Dutch–English translators
20th-century Dutch journalists
Dutch Sephardi Jews
Dutch people of Portuguese-Jewish descent
Dutch Roman Catholics
English people of Portuguese-Jewish descent
English Roman Catholics
French–English translators
Louis Couperus
Recipients of the Order of Leopold II
Writers from Amsterdam
19th-century Dutch journalists
English people of Portuguese descent
Dutch people of Portuguese descent